Losoxantrone (biantrazole) is an anthroquinone anthrapyrazole antineoplastic agent and analog of mitoxantrone. It is also sometimes known as DuP 941.

See also 
Mitoxantrone
Piroxantrone

References 

Antineoplastic drugs
Topoisomerase inhibitors
Amines
Primary alcohols
Nitrogen heterocycles
Heterocyclic compounds with 4 rings
Hydroxyarenes
Ethanolamines
Tetracyclic compounds
Triolena